HMS L26 was a L-class submarine built for the Royal Navy during World War I. The boat was not completed before the end of the war and was  one of three L-class boats to serve during World War II. She was sunk as a target in 1946.

Design and description
L9 and its successors were enlarged to accommodate 21-inch (53.3 cm) torpedoes and more fuel. They displaced  on the surface and  submerged. The L-class submarines had a crew of 35 officers and ratings.

For surface running, the boats were powered by two 12-cylinder Vickers  diesel engines, each driving one propeller shaft. When submerged each propeller was driven by a  electric motor. They could reach  on the surface and  underwater.

The boats were armed with four 21-inch torpedo tubes in the bow and two 18-inch (45 cm) in broadside mounts. They carried four reload torpedoes for the 21-inch tubes for a grand total of ten torpedoes of all sizes. They were also armed with a  deck gun.

Construction and career
HMS L26 was built by Vickers at their Barrow-in-Furness shipyard, launched on 29 May 1919. She was transferred to HM Dockyard, Portsmouth and was completed there on 11 October 1926. The boat was damaged in the Mediterranean in March 1929, but was repaired in Gibraltar.

On 7 October 1933, L26 and sister submarine  ran aground on manoeuvres off Kintyre but were quickly refloated. The next day, 8 October, L26 suffered an explosion in the battery compartment on board in Campbeltown Harbour, Scotland, which killed two and injured 10 crew. L26s commanding officer, Lieutenant-Commander John Hugh Lewis, was Court-martialled over the incidents, and was found guilty of stranding the submarine and failing to check L26s batteries for damage after the grounding. He was severely reprimanded and dismissed from L26 by the court, although a second hearing cleared him of blame for the explosion and re-instated him to command of L26.

At the onset of World War II, L26 was a member of the 6th Submarine Flotilla. From 26–29 August 1939, the flotilla deployed to its war bases at Dundee and Blyth. From 20 September 1939 to 15 January 1940, the 6th Submarine Flotilla was deployed off Skagerrak, Jutland and Horns Reef. L26 was among the submarines assigned to the patrol.

She was transferred to Canada in 1943 as an anti-submarine training ship. Purchased by the Canadian government in 1946, L26 was sunk as a target for sonar testing off St. Margarets Bay, Nova Scotia on 25 September 1946. The wreck was rediscovered during the search for wreckage from the Swissair Flight 111 crash.

Notes

References

External links 
 Description of the L26 wreck 

 

British L-class submarines
Ships built in Barrow-in-Furness
1919 ships
World War I submarines of the United Kingdom
Royal Navy ship names